Mike Petersen (born April 18, 1958) is a former head coach for the Atlanta Dream in 2021. Before joining the Women's National Basketball Association, Petersen worked as a head coach and assistant coach for American university basketball teams from the 1980s to 2010s. Petersen mainly worked in women's basketball as head coach of the Gonzaga, New Mexico State, TCU, Wake Forest and North Texas. With these teams, New Mexico State finished in sixth at the 1994  National Women's Invitational Tournament and enteredt the first round of the 1995 Women's National Invitation Tournament preseason event. Petersen also made it to the third round of the 2005 Women's National Invitation Tournament with Wake Forest. 

In university men's basketball, Petersen was an assistant coach for Northwest Christian College, Oregon and Minnesota. During the late 2010s, Petersen was a part of the National Basketball Association as a scout for the New Orleans Pelicans. Petersen moved to the WNBA in 2017 when he became an assistant coach for the Atlanta Dream. After being selected as interim head coach in May 2021 for the Dream, Petersen ended his position in July 2021 due to his personal health. Following his 6 wins and 13 losses, Petersen was retained with the Dream as an advisor.

Early life and education
Petersen was born in Eureka, California on April 18, 1958. While attending high school, Petersen was on the baseball and basketball teams. From 1976 to 1980, Petersen played basketball for two years at College of the Redwoods before playing an additional two years at Northwest Christian College. 

At Redwoods, Petersen was the team's captain for a season before he left for Northwest Christian. During his playing career at Northwest Christian, Petersen held the points per game season record in 1980 and was named the Most Valuable Player for the college that year. Petersen remained at Northwest Christian until he completed his biblical studies program in 1983.

Career
While at Northwest Christian, Petersen was an assistant coach for their men's basketball team from 1980 to 1983. After leaving the college during the 1983–84 season, Petersen worked for the Oregon Ducks women's basketball team as an assistant coach from 1983 to 1985. As the head coach of the Gonzaga Bulldogs women's basketball from 1985 to 1989, Petersen's team first played in the NAIA. After moving to the NCAA Division I in 1987, Petersen and Gonzaga was first in the 1988 West Coast Athletic Conference. After ending his tenure with Gonzaga in 1989, Petersen had 65 wins and 48 losses. After Petersen left Gonzaga in order to become an assistant coach for the men's basketball team at Butler University, he was chosen as an assistant coach with Oregon in June 1989. From 1989 to 1992, Petersen was an assistant coach on the Oregon Ducks men's basketball team. 

A month after joining the New Mexico State Roadrunners women's basketball team as an assistant coach, Petersen became their head coach in September 1992 after Doug Hosleton resigned. At New Mexico State, Petersen and his team finished in sixth at the 1994 National Women's Invitational Tournament. As a Women's National Invitation Tournament competitor, Petersen and New Mexico State reached the first round of the 1995 preseason event. Following his last year in 1996, Petersen had 81 wins and 38 losses with New Mexico State. With the TCU Horned Frogs women's basketball team from 1996 to 1999, Petersen had 42 wins and 41 losses as their head coach. In 1999, Petersen joined the Minnesota Golden Gophers men's basketball team as an assistant coach. After becoming an associate head coach for the team in 2000, Petersen remained with Minnesota until 2004.

From 2004 to 2012, Petersen was head coach of the Wake Forest Demon Deacons women's basketball team. With Wake Forest, Petersen had 125 wins and 123 losses. During their multiple appearances at the Women's National Invitation Tournament, Petersen and Wake Forest reached the third round
of the 2005 Women's National Invitation Tournament. In April 2012, Petersen replaced Karen Aston as the head coach of the North Texas Mean Green women's basketball team. Petersen had 28 wins and 61 losses with North Texas when his position ended in 2015. 

During the late 2010s, Petersen was a National Basketball Association scout as part of the New Orleans Pelicans before joining the Atlanta Dream in 2017. With the Women's National Basketball Association team, Petersen started out as an assistant coach before he was named the Dream's interim head coach in May 2021. During the 2021 WNBA season, Petersen had 6 wins and 13 losses before ending his coaching position in July 2021 due to his personal health. After being replaced by Darius Taylor, it was announced that Petersen would remain with the Dream as an advisor.

Head coaching record

WNBA

|-
| align="left" | Atlanta
| align="left" | 
| 19 || 6 || 13 ||  || (resigned) || — || — || — || — || —

College

Honors and personal life
Petersen became part of a hall of fame for Northwest Christian College in 2007. He is married and has two children.

References

1958 births
Living people
Oregon Ducks women's basketball coaches
Gonzaga Bulldogs women's basketball coaches
Oregon Ducks men's basketball coaches
New Mexico State Aggies women's basketball coaches
TCU Horned Frogs women's basketball coaches
Minnesota Golden Gophers men's basketball coaches
Wake Forest Demon Deacons women's basketball coaches
North Texas Mean Green women's basketball coaches
New Orleans Pelicans personnel
Atlanta Dream coaches